Jef van Hoof (8 May 1886 - 24 April 1959) was a Belgian composer and conductor with a Flemish ethnic background.

Born in Antwerp, Van Hoof was a pupil of Paul Gilson and was heavily influenced by the works of Peter Benoit. He studied at the Royal Conservatoire of Antwerp, of which he was the director from 1942 to 1944. 
He also conducted concerts associated with the Flemish Movement. He died in Antwerp in 1959 at the age of 72.

He composed chamber music, symphonic works, art songs, works for solo piano, carillon, organ, as well as sacred music. He is particularly known for writing the famous Flemish patriotic song Groeninghe which uses a text by Guido Gezelle.

References
 Biography by Luc Leytens
 Koninklijk Conservatorium Brussel now houses most works and manuscripts of van Hoof, after the bankruptcy of CeBeDeM in 2015.

External links

1886 births
1959 deaths
20th-century classical composers
20th-century conductors (music)
20th-century Belgian male musicians
Belgian composers
Belgian conductors (music)
Composers for carillon
Flemish composers
Male classical composers
Male conductors (music)
Musicians from Antwerp